Scopula punctatissima is a moth of the  family Geometridae. It is found in Taiwan.

References

Moths described in 1911
punctatissima
Moths of Taiwan